Bubble Spur is a flattish rock spur that separates the lower ends of Blankenship Glacier and Tedrow Glacier, to the west of Table Mountain, Royal Society Range, in Victoria Land. The name is one of a group in the area associated with surveying applied in 1993 by New Zealand Geographic Board; a bubble on a surveying instrument is used to indicate its directional tilt and to facilitate its leveling.

References
 

Ridges of Victoria Land
Scott Coast